This rivalry is between Recto's San Sebastian and Mendiola's San Beda.

Head-to-head record by sport

Seniors' Division

General Championship
San Beda has 6 General Championships while San Sebastian has 4 in the General Championship record.
San Beda (6) - 2010-11, 2011-2012, 2012-2013, 2014-2015, 2015-2016, 2016–2017
San Sebastian (4) - 1984-1985, 1988-1989, 1989-1990, 1994-1995

Juniors' Division

General Championship
San Beda leads the general championship race with 11-0.
San Beda (11) - 1982, 1988, 1989, 1990, 1991, 1993, 1995, 1996, 1997, 2015
San Sebastian (6) - 2005, 2006, 2009, 2010, 2011, 2012

Basketball Statistics

Men's basketball results
Both teams are expected to meet at least 2 times per year. Since 2008, San Beda leads the rivalry 28-8

Juniors' Basketball Results

Final Four Rankings
For comparison, these are the rankings of these two teams since the Final Four format was introduced.

Seniors' division

Juniors' division

See also
San Beda Red Lions
San Sebastian Stags
National Collegiate Athletic Association (Philippines)
San Beda–Letran rivalry
San Beda–Perpetual rivalry
San Sebastian–Letran rivalry

References

External links
NCAA historical results
NCAA Season 85 Schedules and Results
NCAA Season 86 Schedules and Results
Google News Archive
Manila Bulletin Online Newspaper Archive

National Collegiate Athletic Association (Philippines) rivalries
San Beda University
San Sebastian College – Recoletos